Shri Ram College of Commerce (SRCC) is a constituent college of the University of Delhi. Founded in 1926 by industrialist Lala Shri Ram, it is widely regarded as the most prestigious college for commerce and economics in India.  SRCC was ranked the best Commerce College in India by India Today in 2020.

Academics

Academic programmes

Shri Ram College offers various courses in Commerce, Economics and Business. These include two undergraduate programs and two post graduate programs:

 Bachelor of Commerce (Hons) 
 B.A (Hons) Economics 
 Masters of Commerce
 PG Diploma in Global Business Operation (PGDGBO).

Additionally, the college has eight departments which include the disciplines of Commerce, Economics, Mathematics, Hindi, English, Political science, Computer science, and Physical education.

Admissions and cutoff
The college has an online application process which comes under the process of University of Delhi. The criteria of admission is merit basis for undergraduate courses and entrance based for postgraduate courses. SRCC intakes students at a relatively high best of four cutoff for its undergraduate programs which usually lie above 98%.

Ranking
SRCC was ranked the best Commerce College in India by India Today in 2020.
It is ranked 12th among colleges in India by the National Institutional Ranking Framework (NIRF) in 2020.

Notable alumni

SRCC has produced several prominent personalities in Indian Politics, Diplomacy and Journalism. The following are the notable alumni of SRCC:

 Arun Jaitley
  Justice Arjan Kumar Sikri
 Rajat Sharma
 Rohinton Fali Nariman
 Vijay Goel
 Gulshan Grover
 Analjit Singh
 Anshu Jain
 Pramod Bhasin
 Anil Rai Gupta
 Lalit Suri
 Navtej Singh Sarna
 Rakeysh Omprakash Mehra
 Nimrat Kaur
 Jitin Prasad
 Bingu wa Mutharika
 Vipin Handa
 Shiv Khera

References

External links 
 Official website

Universities and colleges in Delhi
1926 establishments in India
Educational institutions established in 1926